Praemastus albicinctus is a moth in the subfamily Arctiinae. It was described by Hervé de Toulgoët in 1990. It is found in Costa Rica.

References

Moths described in 1990
Arctiinae